Menno Heerkes (born 22 July 1993) is a Dutch footballer who plays as a midfielder for VV Hoogeveen.

Career
On 23 January 2019, Heerkes signed with VV Hoogeveen after his contract with HHC Hardenberg was terminated a week before.

References

External links
 
 Profile at FuPa
 

1993 births
Living people
People from Hardenberg
Dutch footballers
Dutch expatriate footballers
Dutch expatriate sportspeople in Germany
Expatriate footballers in Germany
Association football midfielders
FC Emmen players
SC Heerenveen players
Heracles Almelo players
SV Meppen players
HHC Hardenberg players
Eredivisie players
Regionalliga players
3. Liga players
Vv Hoogeveen players
Footballers from Overijssel